El Outaya District is a district of Biskra Province, Algeria.

Municipalities
The district has 1 municipality:
El Outaya

References

Districts of Biskra Province